Calafia, or Califia, is the fictional Queen of California in the novel Las sergas de Esplandián

Calafia might also refer to;

Entertainment
 Calafia, a planet in the fictional Uplift Universe by David Brin
 Calafia (album), an album by Gerald Wilson's Orchestra
 Califia, a multimedia hypertext novel by Marjorie Luesebrink

People
 Patrick Califia, an American non-fiction writer

Places
 Calafia Beach Park, a surfing location in San Clemente, California
 Calafia Island, a submerged island between Santa Rosae and the California coast
 Calafia Valley, a wine growing region in Baja California, Mexico
 Plaza Calafia, a bullring in Mexicali, Baja California, Mexico

Other
 Calafia Airlines, a regional airline of Mexico
 CALAFIA, the California Cooperative Latin American Collection Development Group, affiliated with the Seminar on the Acquisition of Latin American Library Materials
 Califia, a genera of Orbiniidae worms

See also
 Califa (disambiguation)
 Kalifa (disambiguation)
 Khalifa (disambiguation)